Shangzhi is a county-level city under the jurisdiction of Harbin, the capital of Heilongjiang province, People's Republic of China. The city proper has a population of around 120,000, while the total administrative population is approximately 600,000 inhabitants. The most spacious county-level division of Harbin City, it borders Yanshou County to the north, Wuchang to the southwest, Acheng District to the northwest, and Bin County to the northwest, as well as the prefecture-level city of Mudanjiang to the southeast.

The city of Shangzhi was once called Zhuhe. It was developed during the Guangxu era in the late Qing dynasty, and was renamed to Shangzhi to commemorate the anti-Japanese war hero Zhao Shangzhi in 1946.

The most famous place in Shangzhi is the Yabuli Skiing Centre -

Climate
Shangzhi has a monsoon-influenced humid continental climate (Köppen Dwb), with long, very dry, bitterly cold winters, very warm and humid summers, and short, rather dry spring and autumn in between. Close to three-fourths of the annual precipitation occurs from June to September. With monthly percent possible sunshine ranging from 49% in July to 63% in March, the city receives 2,450 hours of bright sunshine annually.

Administrative divisions

Shangzhi is divided into 10 towns and seven townships:

Towns
Shangzhi Town
Yabuli
Weihe
Yimianpo
Mao'ershan
Qingyang
Lianghe
Shitouhezi
Yuanbao
Heilonggong

Townships
Zhenzhushan Township
Laojieji Township
Mayan Township
Changshou Township
Wujimi Township
Hedong Township
Yuchi Korean Ethnic Township

Notable people
 Liu Qing, captain of Women's Basketball National Team in the 1980s.
 Yu Wenxia, singer and Miss World 2012.
 Zhao Shangzhi, Commander of the Northeast Anti-Japan United Army during World War II and namesake of this city. A well-known national hero who devoted his life to the Northeastern struggle against Japanese occupation. He was captured and beheaded after a traitor leaked his whereabouts to the Japanese.
 Zhao Yiman, A well-known national heroine who was killed by the Japanese invaders because she refused to leak the secrets about communist operations.

References

External links 

 
Cities in Heilongjiang
Districts of Harbin